Ocular larva migrans (OLM), also known as ocular toxocariasis, is the ocular form of the larva migrans syndrome that occurs when Toxocara canis (dog roundworm) larvae invade the eye. They may be associated with visceral larva migrans. Unilateral visual disturbances, strabismus, and eye pain are the most common presenting symptoms.

Diagnosis
The disease presents with an eosinophilic granulomatous mass, most commonly in the posterior pole of the retina. The granulomatous mass develops around the entrapped larva, in an attempt to contain the spread of the larva.

ELISA testing of intraocular fluids has been demonstrated to be of great value in diagnosing ocular toxocariasis.

Differential diagnosis
The retinal lesion can mimic retinoblastoma in appearance, and mistaken diagnosis of the latter condition can lead to unnecessary enucleation.

Complications
The eye involvement can cause the following inflammatory disorders:
 endophthalmitis
 uveitis
 chorioretinitis

Epidemiology
In contrast to visceral larva migrans, ocular toxocariasis usually develops in older children or young adults with no history of pica. These patients seldom have eosinophilia or visceral manifestations.

References

External links 

Eye diseases
Tropical diseases